Marini De Livera is a Sri Lankan lawyer and social activist who also served as former chairperson of the National Child Protection Authority (NCPA) in Sri Lanka. In 2019, she was awarded the International Women of Courage Award by the United States Department of State.

Career 
Marini De Livera holds a Post-Graduate diploma in human rights and also holds a degree in Speech & Drama at the Trinity College, London. She is also credited for her crucial social services in Sri Lanka especially known for helping women and child victims who are affected due to criminal activities and also had a brief stint as Human Rights trainer for Sri Lanka Army.

In April 2017, she was appointed as the new chairperson of National Child Protection Authority by Sri Lankan President Maithripala Sirisena replacing Natasha Balendran who resigned the job due to personal reasons.

She was presented the International Women of Courage Award on 8 March 2019, (an award which is presented to women for their remarkable achievements which often go unnoticed on the International Women's Day) by US State for her crucial contributions for uplifting the standards of women in Sri Lanka as she was nominated as one of the 10 recipients for the award.

References 

Living people
Sinhalese lawyers
Sri Lankan diplomats
21st-century Sri Lankan lawyers
Sri Lankan women academics
Sri Lankan women activists
Sri Lankan women lawyers
Sri Lankan women ambassadors
Year of birth missing (living people)
Recipients of the International Women of Courage Award